Appalachian quillwort is a common name for several plants and may refer to:

Isoetes appalachiana, native to the eastern United States
Isoetes engelmannii, native to eastern North America